Killester railway station serves the suburbs of Killester and Donnycarney, as well as parts of Artane, in Dublin.

History
The original station opened on 1 October 1845 but closed after two years, re-opening on a new site about  further north in 1923.

The ticket office is open between 5:45 AM to 7:45 PM, Monday to Sunday.

See also
 List of railway stations in Ireland

References

External links
 Irish Rail Killester Station website
 Eiretrains - Killester Station

Killester
Iarnród Éireann stations in Dublin (city)
Railway stations opened in 1845
Railway stations opened in 1923
1845 establishments in Ireland
Railway stations in the Republic of Ireland opened in 1845